Sir Edward Cust, 1st Baronet, KCH (17 March 1794 – 14 January 1878) was a British soldier, politician and courtier.

Early life
He was born in Hill Street, Berkeley Square, London, Middlesex, in 1794, the sixth son of the Brownlow Cust, 1st Baron Brownlow and his second wife Frances Bankes (1756–1847). His older brothers were John Cust, 1st Earl Brownlow, Peregrine Cust, Rev. Henry Cockayne Cust and William Cust.

Cust was educated at Eton College, and the Royal Military College. In 1810, he joined the 16th Regiment of Light Dragoons as a cadet and was Captain of the 5th Regiment of Dragoon Guards from 1816 and Major of the 55th Regiment of Foot from 1821.

Parliamentarian
From 1818, Cust sat in Parliament as member of parliament for Grantham until 1826 and then for Lostwithiel from 1826 to 1832. As a Member of Parliament, he raised concerns about the management of public architectural projects, particular the works at Buckingham House. In 1831, he was knighted and appointed a KCH by William IV for his military service. In February 1834 he was elected a Fellow of the Royal Society.

After the Burning of Parliament in 1834, Cust proposed that the new Houses of Parliament should be to a design chosen in an open competition. He prevailed on Sir Robert Peel, Prime Minister in late 1834, and a competition was held. Cust in this way successfully opposed the appointment of Robert Smirke to be the architect. Peel was replaced by Lord Melbourne as Prime Minister in April 1835, and it was decided to proceed with the competition along Cust's lines, with the style limited to Elizabethan or Gothic, so rejecting the neo-classical.

In 1835 Cust was appointed one of the Royal Commissioners for reporting on the plans offered. The others, all amateurs from the point of view of architectural knowledge, were Charles Hanbury-Tracy, Thomas Liddell, 1st Baron Ravensworth, Samuel Rogers and George Vivian. The successful design was that of Charles Barry, whom Cust knew from the Travellers' Club.

Courtier
In 1816 Cust became equerry to Prince Leopold of Saxe-Coburg, who that year married Princess Charlotte of Wales. When Leopold became the first King of the Belgians in 1831, Cust went to Belgium. Leopold made him a grand’officer in his Order of Leopold in 1855.

In 1845, Queen Victoria appointed Cust Assistant Master of the Ceremonies and he was promoted to Master of the Ceremonies in 1847.

New Zealand
Cust joined the Canterbury Association on 27 May 1848, but resigned again on 22 November of that year.

In 1849, the Cust River in Canterbury was named after Sir Edward Cust. The township of Cust was in turn named after the river.

Later life
In 1859 Cust was given the colonelcy for life of the 16th (The Queen's) Regiment of (Light) Dragoons (Lancers). In 1876, he was made a baronet.

Bibliography
Cust wrote:

Family

Cust married in 1821 Mary Anne Boode, daughter of Lewis William Boode of Peover Hall in Cheshire. They had a son and five daughters. The Boode family were Dutch planters in Demerara, Lewis William being originally Lodewijk Willem Boode, and the brother of Andreas Christian Boode (1763–1844). Mary inherited from her mother Margaret, daughter of the Rev. Thomas Dannett of Liverpool and a widow by 1802, the Greenwich Park estate in Demerara, on her death c.1827. Before Margaret's death, in the 1823–4 parliamentary session, Cust was appointed to the committee of the West India planters and merchants there.

Mary Cust was lady of the bedchamber to Princess Victoria of Saxe-Coburg-Saalfeld. A further family property inherited from her mother was Leasowe Castle. Edward Cust received half the compensation for the enslaved people on the Greenwich Park estate under the Slavery Abolition Act 1833.

The couple had a son and five daughters. The children were:

 Sir Leopold Cust, 2nd Baronet (1831–1878), married 1863 Charlotte Sobieski Isabel Bridgeman.
 Louisa Mary Ann (died 1863), married in 1862 the Rev. John James Moss. He was the son of John Moss (1782–1858), the plantation owner and Liverpool banker.
 Victoria Mary Louisa (died 1895) married 1846 Simon Yorke III (died 1894) of Erddig.
Ethelred or Etheldreda Victoria (died 1893), married 1864 Charles Henry Congreve (died 1875).
Margaret Amy Frances, married 1850 Charles Randle Egerton R.N. (died 1869). His father, Wilbraham Egerton of Tatton Park, had been executor for Margaret Boode.
Henrietta Maria Christina (died 1846), did not marry.

References

External links
Cracroft's Peerage
The London Gazette

1794 births
1878 deaths
5th Dragoon Guards officers
55th Regiment of Foot officers
Baronets in the Baronetage of the United Kingdom
Members of the Parliament of the United Kingdom for English constituencies
UK MPs 1818–1820
UK MPs 1820–1826
UK MPs 1826–1830
Younger sons of barons
UK MPs 1830–1831
UK MPs 1831–1832
British Army generals
Members of the Parliament of the United Kingdom for constituencies in Cornwall
Fellows of the Royal Society
People educated at Eton College
Graduates of the Royal Military College, Sandhurst
Members of the Canterbury Association
Edward
Historic Society of Lancashire and Cheshire